Szpęgawsk  is a village in the administrative district of Gmina Starogard Gdański, within Starogard County, Pomeranian Voivodeship, in northern Poland. The village has a population of 620.

For details of the history of the region, see History of Pomerania.

During the Nazi occupation, around 5,000-7,000 Polish civilians were executed between September 1939 and January 1941 in the Forest of Szpęgawsk (Las Szpęgawski), most of them intellectuals and Jews from Pomerania.

Notable people
 Bogdan Wenta, Polish handball player, coach and politician

References

Villages in Starogard County
Holocaust locations in Poland